Pine Hill Station is a pastoral lease that operates as a cattle station in the southern Northern Territory.

Location

History
The  property was sold in 2019 by Filipino banker and property developer Romeo Roxas for 10 million in early 2019 to South Australian couple Greg and Sharon Vickers who also own properties around Keith as well as Delny and Delmore Downs Stations in the Northern Territory.

Roxas acquired Pine Hill in 2016 after he bought Murray Downs and Epenarra Stations, south-east of Tennant Creek, in 2015 for over 20 million. All the properties were placed on the market late in 2018

The Native title holders are celebrating the recognition of their rights on the western side of Pine Hill Station, north of Alice Springs.

See also
List of ranches and stations

References

Stations (Australian agriculture)
Pastoral leases in the Northern Territory